Peninsula Division is an electoral division in Babergh District, Suffolk which returns a single County Councillor to Suffolk County Council. It comprises all of Brantham, Ganges and Stour Wards plus parts of Orwell Ward.

References

Electoral Divisions of Suffolk